The following lists events that happened during 1926 in Afghanistan.

Incumbents
 Monarch – Amanullah Khan

Events

 Afghanistan suffers during the year from the effects of the great Khost rebellion of the previous year, and little, if any, progress is made in developing the country.
 June 9 - Amanullah Khan changes his title from amir to padshah ("king").
 August 31 - A treaty of neutrality and mutual nonaggression between Afghanistan and the Soviet Union is concluded. The first clause in the treaty provides for "neutrality in the event of an armed conflict between either of the parties with a third power", while in another clause each party agrees "not to permit in its territory the activities of elements having for their object hostile action against the other party to the treaty". This treaty is the beginning for Afghanistan of closer relations with Russia, and is followed by a "treaty of friendship" concluded on September 14, and by negotiations for an Afghan-Soviet trade agreement. These steps do not improve Afghanistan's relations with the Indian government, which is already looking with suspicion on some of its military activities; so much so that in August Mr. Yunus, the secretary of the Afghan legation in London, thought it necessary to send a communication to The Times stating that the number of Afghanistan's aeroplanes was too small to cause any apprehension, and that the Russians engaged in the air service were employed as pilots or mechanics in the same way as any other Europeans.
 The Swedish citizen Aurora Nilsson arrives with her Afghan spouse Asim Khan, becomes a royal adviser to the queen and arouses a lot of attention in contemporary Kabul.

Births

Deaths

References

 
Afghanistan
Afghanistan
Years of the 20th century in Afghanistan
1920s in Afghanistan